Jesús Giancarlos Rabanal Dávila (born December 25, 1984) is a Peruvian footballer who currently plays as a left back for Unión Huaral.

Club career
Rabanal made his league debut with Universitario de Deportes in the 2004 Torneo Descentralizado season. He managed to score his first goal in the Torneo Descentralizado in the 2007 season.

In January 2012, Rabanal left Universitario and joined their rivals Alianza Lima for the start of the 2012 season.

International career
Rabanal made his debut with the Peruvian national team on 4 September 2010 in a friendly match away to Canada, which finished in a 2–0 win for Peru.

Honours

Club
Universitario de Deportes
 Apertura: 2008
 Torneo Descentralizado: 2009

References

External links 

1984 births
Living people
Footballers from Lima
Association football fullbacks
Peruvian footballers
Peruvian expatriate footballers
Peru international footballers
Club Universitario de Deportes footballers
Club Alianza Lima footballers
FC Kairat players
Club Deportivo Universidad César Vallejo footballers
Alianza Atlético footballers
Sport Rosario footballers
Unión Comercio footballers
FC Carlos Stein players
Unión Huaral footballers
Peruvian Primera División players
Peruvian Segunda División players
Kazakhstan Premier League players
Expatriate footballers in Kazakhstan